is a mountain pass  high at the north-end of the Hidaka Mountains of Hokkaidō, Japan.

Overview
It is a transportation hub connecting Doo and Eastern. Alcause the altitude is 1,022m, it is comparable to the 3,000m altitude level in Hon state from the vegetation environment, and it is a pass with  The section from Bridge to Ishiyama, Shimizu Town (33.3 km) is a special traffic  It is easily affected by fog all year round, especially in the summer, when visibility is caused by heavy fog mainly on the in winter, visibility failure. It is a pass where traffic accidents occur frequently due to such and has been installing eye guidance facilities and implementing measures There are also waiting areas (emergency waiting areas) for climbing lanes.
In 2011, the Doto Expressway connected to the doo area, reducing the burden of over the pass.

Out Line 
Snow is possible on the pass from October to May. Japan National Route 274 crosses the pass between Hidaka and Shimizu.

References

EXternal Links
 Geographical Survey Institute
 Northern Road Navi

Mountain passes of Japan